Charles Karel Bouley, known on-the-air as Karel (pronounced ka-REL), is an American entertainer, talk radio host, singer, TV personality, stage performer, journalist, and author. He began his career as a comic and vocalist with 1995's album "Dance...Or Else" and was signed to Jellybean Recordings under John "Jellybean" Benitez. While promoting a record, he was signed to do a radio show on KYPA Los Angeles called "Different After Dark." His life partner off-air, Andrew Howard became his co-host on-air and within two years the duo made history as the first openly gay radio talk show hosts on KFI in Los Angeles. in 1998.  Howard, already suffering from AIDS, died suddenly of a blood clot in 2001.

Karel stayed at KFI for almost two years. After a shift in management at KFI Karel and others were let go but he soon landed a show in San Francisco, the No. 4 Arbitron Market in the United States, on radio station KGO. He was fired from KGO in November 2008 when an engineer left his microphone open and his profane off-air comments about Joe the Plumber were broadcast live. Bouley was forced to re-invent himself, returning to stand-up comedy, writing for the HuffingtonPost and re-entering radio with a self-syndicated show heard first on Energy San Francisco and KRXA Monterey/Salinas/Santa Cruz.  The show aired five days a week, going nationwide after negotiating a satellite hookup with GCN, Genesis Communication Network. In November 2011, Karel returned to KGO, but he was again let go in February 2015 when Cumulus Media fired most of the staff. In 2008 he started podcasting and his show has expanded to TV and OTT. He continues to record as well.

Bouley has been a writer since he was a teenager, for both local and national publications. He was a photographer and writer for the R&B Report, an entertainment reporter for Genre Magazine and The Advocate as well as a political columnist and blogger for Advocate.com. He was asked by Arianna Huffington on air to blog for her new site, the HuffingtonPost, where he has maintained a column for eight years running. for The Huffington Post, His editorials have appeared in The Wall Street Journal. He was also an editor and columnist for The Advocate.com, and a celebrity columnist and photographer for Billboard Magazine. His first book, "You Can't Say That" was published by Alyson Publications, his second, "Shouting at Windmills, BS From Bush to Obama" through Amazon. He continues working actively in all media.

Biography 

Charles Raymond Bouley, II  was born November 7, 1962, in Miami Beach, Florida, to Charles Raymond Bouley (1929–1987) and Rose Marie (née Tremblay) Bouley (1930–2003). He has been an entertainer since childhood, emceeing his first event in 7th grade, the talent show, "Car Wash", at his junior high school. While attending Long Beach Poly High School, Bouley was editor of the high school's newspaper, "High Life." and reviewed plays for his school paper for free by taking the words "high school" out of the paper's masthead and getting on all the PR lists. As a member of the press he was able to be included on press-only lists for premieres and openings in the Los Angeles area. With this type of press access, Bouley began attending stage productions and writing reviews of the shows for publication in his school and community newspapers. Unable to afford movie tickets, he became an usher at the Long Beach Terrace Theatre so he could review the new releases.

Bouley attended community college in southern California and then university on scholarship where he majored in theatre with a minor in journalism, but left to work in the field before graduating. He began singing and performing in Orange County, CA and Long Beach, CA in mostly GLBT clubs in the 1980s. In the 1990s Karel went on to work for Billboard Magazineand other high-profile publications while performing; his affiliation with the publications gave him further access to music concerts and a network of music professionals. . He would call upon those contacts to launch his own music, television and radio career, publish two books and complete over 3000 hours of TV and radio, 1000 live shows, one album and a weekly column for almost three decades.

Before radio 
Before his radio career began in the late 1990s, Karel was a stand-up comic and recording artist. While getting very little attention from the LGBT press, his 1995 album, "Dance ... Or Else," attracted critical notice in the mainstream press, it was named No. 10 pick-of-the-year by "Billboard"'s Dance Music editor Larry Flick.  Karel later recorded the single "Don't Stop" with Steve Bronski and the single "I Am" with Jellybean Benitez as well as "Take Your Heartache Away" also on the Jellybean label. Many projects featured Thea Austin, a personal friend of Karel and former lead singer of Snap!!.  Bouley also owned a graphic arts company and worked as a celebrity photographer, imaging celebrities such as Michael Jackson and Diana Ross.

Recording 
Karel worked with R&B artist Vesta Williams and brought producer Michael Eckart to the table. Vesta recorded with Eckart and as a thank you Eckart produced and co-wrote an album with Karel and others. The first single was "Everybody, Get On Up" and was released in 1994. In 1995 Karel released the eight song album "Dance...Or Else" distributed by MS Distribution on Karel's own Orbik Records. That album as named the #10 Dance Album of the Year by Billboard's Larry Flick.

Karel toured and did music videos for the album, all featuring his best friend Thea Austin, the former lead singer of Snap! who wrote and sang Rhythm Is A Dancer. He then went on to record a cover of the song "Don't Stop" by one of his idols, the late Sylvester. It was released internationally by the SAIFAM group and remixed by the Factory team. It charted internationally. He again toured, this time opening for acts like Grace Jones and RuPaul.

Karel came to the attention of John "Jellybean" Benitez, producer and writer and label owner. Karel was signed and release "I Am" and "Take Your Heartache Away" on the Jellybean label. It was at this time he became a voting member of NARAS, the Recording Academy as a move to get Dance Music a category (which occurred).

It was while Karel was promoting these records that he came to the attention of radio producer Malcolm Burman, who offered him a radio show on KYPA Los Angeles.

In 2017 Karel and friends Thea Austin, Morgan Mallory and Daniel Charleston recorded "Stronger Together" to try and promote unity during a contentious election cycle. The video is on all streaming services and the single has received over tens-of-thousands of streams on Spotify and other streaming services.

In 2019 Karel released a cover of the Bette Midler disco classic "Married Men"produced by Leo Frappier with a supporting video shot and edited by Brandon Riley Miller on D-Money Records. The song was released on August 27, 2019 world-wide with the video released on September 3, 2019. The video features Karel in Las Vegas Wedding Chapel District as well as in green screen with images of famous men who have cheated on their wives projected on him. According to Karel's Website, the single is from a 2020 release entitled "Why I Sing" which will serve as Karel's reentry in to music with his first complete album in 25 years.

List of Releases:

 Everybody (Get On Up) Michael Eckart / Dain Noel Writers Kushi Records, 1995 (single and video)
 Turn It Up (single) Sebastian Reyes Writer Orbik Records 1996
 Live To Tell (Single, Cover) Patrick Leonard, Writer Orbik Records 1997 (single and Video)
 Dance...Or Else (Album) Orbik Records / MS Distribution 1998
 "Don't Stop" (single, Sylvester cover) James Tip Wirrick Jeff Mehl, Writers, Saifam/The Factory Team 1998
 "I Am" (Single) Brinsley Evans, Writer Jellybean Recordings 1998
 "Take Your Heartache Away" (Single) Jellybean Recording 1998
 Stronger Together (Single) Karel and Morgan Mallory, Writer, Karel.Media 2017
 Married Men (Single and EP) Dominic Bugatti, Frank Musker, Writers, D-Money Records 2019

Radio talk show host

History
Bouley, along with his domestic partner, Andrew Howard, started in radio at KYPA Los Angeles, were featured on GayRadio KWIZ 96.7 FM in addition to Triangle Broadcasting based in Palm Springs, California. For the latter, the duo hosted a morning program, "Good Morning Gay America".

Professionally known as "Karel and Andrew", Bouley and Howard became the first openlygay radio talk-show hosts on a US major-market radio station in 1998. Hired for the afternoon drive slot at Los Angeles' KFI, the duo replaced KFI mainstays John Kobylt and Ken Chiampou. "I'm sure there are a million gay [radio] hosts, but not many of them are open, and no one had ever appeared on the air as a gay couple," said Ron Rodrigues, editor-in-chief of Radio & Records magazine. " The backbone of their on-air banter was their contrasting world views. Bouley, who dominated the conversation, could be stopped in his tracks with one, well-placed word from Howard". Al Peterson, an editor at Radio & Records magazine said, "They didn't feel like it was their job to be the poster boys for the gay community or to effect social change, just because they were the first openly gay hosts who were partners off the air."

In March 2000, "Karel & Andrew" was moved from the afternoon-drive slot into the evening-drive slot to accommodate the nationally syndicated Phil Hendrie Show. The show followed Hendrie's until April 2001 when the station again went through changes. Karel & Andrew took a three-week vacation while the station worked on a new spot for them however Andrew Howard, who had AIDS, died unexpectedly on May 21, 2001. David G. Hall, KFI's Director of Syndication, was quoted at the time of the change as saying "KFI might still find a spot" for "The Karel & Andrew Show," stressing that the team "haven't been terminated." The station's programmers said they were preparing to return "Karel & Andrew" to the airwaves by putting their show on another Clear Channel station but Howard's death ended those plans.

Following his partner's death, Bouley returned to KFI and hosted a talk show there until station management changed and he and others were dismissed in April 2002. Seven months later, Karel was hired as an on-air host by the most successful San Francisco radio station at the time, KGO, for the weekend evening time slot.

Karel would stay at KGO over the course of 10 years and two high-profile firings and re-hirings. In 2015 Karel left terrestrial radio for podcasting, The Karel Cast, heard on all streaming services including Spotify, iHeart, iTunes and Spreaker. There is a dedicated app for the Karel Cast and it streams all the content through it as well. As of 2022, the Karel Cast and Karel Outspoken airs three times per week, each a 1/2 audio and video episode. The show’s focus is current events, earth-based living and eating and entertainment. According to the show, it often ranks in the top 200 throughout the world on the Apple iTunes Podcast charts.

Other media 
Karel's live stage show "Karel Stands Up" began in 2008 and he has done over 300 shows since then, to great acclaim. He maintains an active YouTube channel and a dedicated Karel Cast App. Bouley has appeared on television, having completed two seasons on TNN's Ultimate Revenge with Ryan Seacrest. He also wrote and directed a 60-second spot, Barbarians at the Gate of Our Future, which won second place in the GLAAD "I Do" Marriage Equality project. Bouley has been a fill-in host on the Bill Press radio talk show and has also appeared as a guest commentator on topical issues on CNN, MSNBC and Fox News. He has appeared as a frequent guest on TV and radio as a Macintosh Computer expert. On August 4, 2010, Karel appeared on the nationally syndicated Alan Colmes Show to discuss that day's controversial decision to overturn California's Proposition 8, and once again allow equal marriage rights for gay people. The next day, Colmes appeared on The Karel Show, referring to him as a "trailblazer" for the rights of gay citizens.

Television OTT 
Karel appears regularly as a guest on CNN, MSNBC, Fox News and other outlets. In 2014 Karel and Brandon Riley Miller launched "Karel Life in Segments' on Free Speech TV. The show is still listed in 2019 on the network's roster and Karel has stated on his show that it will be coming back for a fifth season in 2020. The show was a groundbreaking reality / news / talk show that tackles current events and issues that directly impact Karel's life, and thus, the title: his life, in segments. The show received positive reviews and popularity on the channel and online. To date, according to Karel's Website, the show has shot and aired 50 episodes (August 29, 2019).

In the late 1990s Karel starred with Ryan Seacrest and Marc Summers in the Woody Fraiser production "The Ultimate Revenge" for Spike TV / TNN. The show was an early reality practical joke show, helping start the trend of successful unscripted programming. Seacrest served as Master of Ceremonies as Karel and a cast of others played jokes on unsuspecting members of the public set up by their friends. It ran for three seasons with Karel appearing in 15 episodes according to IMDB.

Karel produced and starred in four seasons of “Life In Segments” for FSTV (Free Speech TV)from 2012 to 2016. The show ended with Karel relocating to Las Vegas in 2017 from Long Beach, CA.

Books 
In 2004, Bouley authored a book of essays titled, You Can't Say That. In this well-titled book, he speaks frankly about a wide range of topics.  The book was published by the LGBT publishing house, Alyson Press. Karel also contributed to "When I Knew" by Robert Trachtenberg, stories of "coming out" directed at Gay and Lesbian youth.

Bouley's second book, Shouting at Windmills, BS From Bush to Obama was released in June 2011, and is now in bookstores, and Amazon Kindle.  This wide-ranging book of essays chronicles the end of the Bush Era and Obama's rise to the presidency. It also reveals what life is like after a very public firing and puts the "Joe the Plumber" issue to rest.

In 2019 Karel announced on his radio show The Sassy Six that he is finishing a book entitled "The Planted Host" about his complete physical transformation from 310 pounds to 189 through plant-based eating and exercise. The book is set to be released in 2020 according to the show. There is a television show / OTT planned as well of the same name.

Appellate court battle 
Following the sudden death of his domestic partner, Andrew Howard, in 2001, "Charles Karel Bouley II"  went on to file and win a lawsuit in the Court of Appeal of the State of California in Los Angeles County to establish the rights of domestic partners to be recognized as such and giving them the right to sue for wrongful death: AB 25 of 2005, the "California Domestic Partnership Law". This court victory effectively changed the wrongful death laws in California for domestic partners, as well as making them retroactive.

Following Karel's victory, which effectively changed case law in California, Governor Schwarzenegger, when signing AB 25, wrote: "This legislation ... is about civil rights, respect, responsibility, and, most of all, it is about family. Therefore, I am honored to sign one of the strongest domestic partner laws in the nation."

Controversies
In November 2008, when Bouley was hosting his weekend 7–10 p.m. call-in program on KGO the sound engineer failed to mute Bouley's microphone during the national news break. When a reference to Joe the Plumber came up during the news, Bouley was clearly heard on-air ranting: "Fuck goddamn Joe the goddamn mother-fucking Plumber! I want mother-fucking Joe the Plumber dead!" Following the news break, Bouley profusely apologized to the audience for the incident, explaining he was told his microphone was "dead," and that his words were never intended to be aired. He also explained that to him, "Joe the Plumber" was a fictional character and he meant no harm to anyone. Bouley's comments earned him the title "pinhead," for the second time, from Fox's Bill O'Reilly on The O'Reilly Factor, Monday, November 3, 2008. The remark also earned him a spot on the "40 Most Obnoxious Quotes for 2008" in the "Right Wing News". He was rated an impressive No. 8 of the worst. KGO issued a news release on the afternoon of November 11, 2008 stating that he had been terminated. Bouley stated in November 2008, that he does take responsibility for the incident, and later said, "I am sorry anyone thought I wanted a real person dead, I did not. I am sorry that anyone has to go through any trouble over what I said while making tea in my home studio kitchen with my always live mike. Karel also reiterated that he was told by the inexperienced KGO engineer that his microphone was off. The engineer, who had left the studio to use the restroom, had been told, he says, to make sure the microphone was dead during breaks, because Karel talks to his video chat room during the break, often using language inappropriate for the airwaves.
In March 2007, Karel wrote the following for the online The Huffington Post, regarding reports that White House spokesman Tony Snow had developed colon cancer: "I hear about Tony Snow and say to myself, well, stand up every day, lie to the American people at the behest of your dictator-esque boss and well, how could a cancer not grow in you? ... I know, it's horrible. I admit it. I don't wish anyone harm, even Tony Snow. And I do hope he recovers ... and surrounds himself with friends and family for his journey. But in the back of my head there's Justin Timberlake's "What goes around, goes around, comes around, comes all the way back around, ya ... When controversy immediately ensued, Bouley replaced the draft and the inflammatory statements were removed with a notation that it had been edited from the original version. The original post, however, got wide airplay on television and the internet, and was widely circulated in print, compelling Huffington Post editor Roy Sekoff to speak out about the issue on The O'Reilly Factor shortly after the row.
In June 2004, Karel opened his weekend KGO program with a clip of The Wizard of Oz song, "Ding-Dong the Witch is Dead!" as a "tribute" to former President Ronald Reagan, who had died earlier that day. He went on to rant about Reagan during the first two hours of his show because of what he saw as the inaction of Reagan and his administration in the face of the developing AIDS crisis, propagating the perception it was a "gay disease".  The Monday following Reagan's death, Bouley was severely criticized by listeners in addition to being strongly reprimanded by KGO management. He later apologized on the air, not for what he said, but for choosing to air his comments the same day as the former president's death. He later included an open letter of apology to Nancy Reagan in his book You Can't Say That. Bouley later added:

I was in fact disrespectful that day and there's plenty of time for that later.  A generation of young gay Americans died on Reagan's watch, and it was OK because basically they deserved it for living the 'lifestyle'. Say something against the person that is partially responsible for those attitudes before he's put in the ground, and that's classless. Let the gay man inside of me out in his righteous indignation, and he gets slapped under the guise of propriety. Next time I will let the dust settle. But when it settles ....

Current career 
In 2008, Bouley returned to stand-up comedy and re-entered radio. Billed as  Karel Stands Up!, he is regularly seen performing his uncensored stand-up comedy to sold-out audiences in the former Rrazz Room, in San Francisco and at Planet Gemini in Monterey, California. He has also appeared with Bruce Vilanch at Cobb's Comedy Club, in San Francisco. He has performed at The Comedy Store in Los Angeles and at The Laugh Factory in Long Beach, California.

In March 2009, Bouley was employed by San Francisco's KNGY as well as by KRXA in Monterey, California, his only remuneration coming from ad revenue and unemployment benefits. Shortly thereafter, he was hired by San Francisco's Green 960, which became his home station.  Working from his home studio, he had been his own producer, engineer and ad salesman for over two years. In January 2010, Bouley was hired by KKGN, San Francisco. KJRB, in Spokane, Washington has added Bouley's show to their lineup. as has KGOE in Eureka, California, Green 1640 in Decatur and Atlanta, Georgia, KJFK Reno, WXMR in Vermont and WVNJ in New Jersey, and some areas of New York. "The Karel Show" went into syndication in December 2010, after Bouley negotiated a satellite hook-up with Genesis Communication Network. In November 2011, Karel added an FM station, KNWZ 94.3, to his lineup on Sundays, 5PM to 7 pm, also serving KPLM, KPSC, KPSF, KPSH, KPSI, KPSI-FM, KPST-FM, KPTR, KRCK-FM, KUNA-FM, KVLA-FM, KWXY, KXPS, California Radio Markets Bakersfield, Chico, Fresno, Los Angeles, Merced, Modesto, and Oxnard-Ventura. In 2019 Karel decided to curtail much of his podcasting to concentrate on Television, Music and other endeavors. His daily show went podcast and video and was cut down to six minutes by choice. The daily video joins Life in Segments as his second online TV show, and Life in Segments as of 2019 is still on Free Speech TV's roster.

The "Karel Show" on KGO was reinstated in March 2011. and could be heard from 9 pm −12am on Saturdays and 7pm- 10pm on Sundays.

"They say home is where the heart is and I definitely left my heart at the KGO studios. It's my radio home, my flagship," Karel states.  Jack Swanson, KGO's former operations director, had been supportive of Karel returning to the station for some time.

February 2015, Bouley was again fired from KGO, this time due to continuing budget cuts by KGO's current owner, Cumulus Media, including the replacement of local programming with low-cost national syndicated shows.

Karel started a podcast and online show in 2008, and the Karel Cast in 2019 is available on every major streaming service, ProgressiveVoices Network, Genesis Communications, iHeart, iTunes, Spreaker, TuneIn and more. The show is heard Monday through Friday and there is a dedicated App in all the App stores.

In 2014 Karel signed a deal with Free Speech TV to begin the self-produced show, Karel's Life in Segments. The show airs weekly and in 2019 will be entering its fifth season for the network. The show is part reality show, part talk show, or "reality chat" as described by Karel in the media. The show follows Karel through his life as an entertainer, author and talk show host, merging topics from pop culture and the news with issues facing Karel (and viewers) in daily life.

Karel released the single Stronger Together  in 2017 after the contentious election of Donald J. Trump. That song featured Thea Austin, Morgan Mallory and Daniel Charleston and featured a video as well.

In 2019 Karel released Married Men EP, a cover of a Bette Midler Disco song, with a supporting video. He entered his fifth season of Life in Segments, is releasing a book about plant based eating along with a supporting TV show, is completing a full-length album and moved his studios to Las Vegas, NV where he resides with his service animal and friend, #EmberDoes_Vegas .

In 2020 Karel became the producer and host of the Dorians TV Toast and the Dorian Film Toast for the Society of Gay and Lesbian Entertainment critics . He hosted and produced  the Dorians TV Toast 2020, Dorians Film toast 2021 and Dorians TV Toast 2021 for the LGBTQ network Revry as well as here Media and Free Speech TV. The shows were well received by the entertainment press and numerous high-level entertainers participated in the shows  including Hugh Jackman, Olivia Newton-John, Cynthia Nixon, Margaret Cho, Russel T. Davies, Fran Drescher, Leslie Jordan and others.

In 2021 Karel released a cover of the Blue Magic song SideShow and according to his official twitter feed @reallykarel it is from an upcoming vocal project.

References 
Notes

External links 
 
 
 City Brights: Rich Lieberman

1962 births
American political commentators
American stand-up comedians
American talk radio hosts
Gay comedians
American gay musicians
American gay writers
HuffPost writers and columnists
American LGBT broadcasters
LGBT people from Florida
Living people
Radio personalities from San Francisco
21st-century American comedians
American LGBT comedians